Meantime or mean time may refer to:

Time
Greenwich Mean Time, the mean solar time at the Royal Observatory, Greenwich in England: often used to refer to Coordinated Universal Time
Local mean time,  a form of solar time that corrects the variations of local apparent time
Washington Mean Time, the time at the meridian through the center of the old dome atop the main building at the old US Naval Observatory at Washington, D.C., U.S.A.

Entertainment
Meantime (film), the 1983 film by Mike Leigh
Meantime (video game), a cancelled video game
Meantime (album), the second album and major-label debut by Helmet, released in 1992
"Meantime", a 2007 song by Beatsteaks
"Meantime", a song by The Futureheads from their album The Futureheads
"Mean Time", a prize-winning poetry collection by British poet laureate Carol Ann Duffy
Meantime (EP), a 2012 EP by Kwes

Engineering and mechanics
Mean time between failure,  the "average" time between failures, the reciprocal of the failure rate in the special case when failure rate is constant
Mean time between outages, the mean time between equipment failures that result in loss of system continuity or unacceptable degradation
Mean time to recovery, the average time that a device will take to recover from a non-terminal failure
Mean free time, the average time between collisions between interacting particles

Business
Meantime Brewing, a craft brewer of speciality beers

See also
 In the Meantime (disambiguation)